Paolo Bressi (born 25 July 1987) is an Italian powerlifter and a former paracanoeist who has competed since the late 2000s. He won a silver medal in the K-1 200 m TA event at the 2010 ICF Canoe Sprint World Championships in Poznań.

References

External links
2010 ICF Canoe Sprint World Championships men's K-1 200 m TA results. - accessed 20 August 2010.

Italian male canoeists
Living people
ICF Canoe Sprint World Championships medalists in paracanoe
1987 births
TA classification paracanoeists
Paracanoeists of Italy
21st-century Italian people